Günter Wyszecki (1925 – June 22, 1985) was a German-Canadian physicist who made important contributions to the fields of colorimetry, color discrimination, color order, and color vision.

Education
Wyszecki was born in Tilsit, East Prussia, Germany (today Sovetsk, Russia). He attended the Technische Universität Berlin where he was awarded a Dr.-Ing. degree, with a dissertation on normal and anomalous trichromacy. In 1953 he was awarded a Fulbright Scholarship and for a year joined Deane B. Judd at the Colorimetry and Photometry section of the U. S. National Bureau of Standards in Washington DC.

Career
In 1955 Wyszecki joined the National Research Council of Canada in Ottawa where he became the leader of its Optics Section in 1960 and Assistant Director of the Division of Physics in 1982, and where he remained until his untimely death from leukemia. Wyszecki is best known for his scientific contributions to and leadership in the International Commission on Illumination (CIE). He was chairman of its Colorimetry Committee from 1963 to 1975, vice president of the organization from 1979 to 1983 and its president from 1983 until his death. During this period the CIE made many important recommendations in colorimetry, remaining valid today, such as 1 nm tables of the color-matching functions of the two CIE standard observers and the standard illuminants A and D65, addition of integrating-sphere reflectance factor measurement as a recommended measuring geometry, the 1964 (U*V*W*) and the 1976 CIELAB and CIELUV uniform color space and color difference formulas, and others.

Metamerism: Wyszecki introduced the important concept of ‘metameric blacks,’ psychophysical definitions of blacks with tristimulus values 0, 0, 0 that within limits can be added to a spectral reflectance to form the various possible metamers (with an identical set of tristimulus values) under a given light. With Walter Stiles he also developed mathematical methods to calculate by various methodologies the number of possible metamers for given chromaticities, peaking at the achromatic colors.

Wyszecki seven-field colorimeter: In 1965 Wyszecki developed the seven-field colorimeter with which an observer can view with both eyes one or more of seven hexagonal fields, each with separately controllable RGB sources achieved with filtered light, mixed in an integrating sphere.

Color matching and color-difference matching: David MacAdam's color-matching error ellipses of 1942 (1 observer) were extended in 1957 for 12 observers by Brown and in 1971 by Wyszecki and Fielder. The latter two investigations demonstrated the considerable variability by observer. The seven-field colorimeter was also used for a novel color-difference matching experiment in which three fields were displayed and the observer had to adjust the third field so that its brightness matched the brightness of preselected colors with equal luminance in two fields and its chromaticity resulted in identical perceived differences between the colors in the triangular arrangement.

Heterochromatic brightness matching: Wyszecki and co-workers also added important experimental data to the luminance of equally bright stimuli. Many chromatic stimuli, when compared to achromatic ones of the same psychophysical brightness or lightness appear to be lighter or brighter, to be "glowing," an effect known as the Helmholtz–Kohlrausch effect.

Publications
Wyszecki authored or co-authored 86 scientific papers and 3 books. The first book, Farbsysteme was published in Germany in 1960, describing color order systems. He co-authored together with Deane Judd the second and third editions of the latter's Color in Business, Science and Industry, the third edition after the passing of Judd. He was the lead author, together with Stiles, of the monumental Color Science: Concepts and Methods, Quantitative Data and Formulae, with editions in 1967 and 1982. The second edition remains in print today as a highly important source of information in the field of color science.

References

1925 births
1985 deaths
German emigrants to Canada
People from Tilsit
People from East Prussia
20th-century Canadian physicists
20th-century German physicists
Color scientists